Coopers Plains railway station is located on the Beenleigh line in Queensland, Australia. It serves the Brisbane suburb of Coopers Plains.

History
The station opened in 1885 at the same time as the line. In 2008, an upgrade of the station was completed as part of the Salisbury to Kuraby triplication project. This included converting the western platform to an island, and a new footbridge with lifts.

Services
Cooper Plains station is served by all stops Beenleigh line services from Beenleigh and Kuraby to Bowen Hills and Ferny Grove. Some services terminate at Platform 2.

Services by platform

References

External links

Coopers Plains station Queensland's Railways on the Internet
[ Coopers Plains station] TransLink travel information

Railway stations in Brisbane
Railway stations in Australia opened in 1885